Stob Choire Claurigh is a mountain in Lochaber in the Scottish Highlands, with a height of . It is described as one of the best ridge walks on the Scottish mainland.

Overview
Stob Choire Claurigh stands in the Grey Corries, a group of mountains strung out along an eight km long ridge which never falls below the 800 metre (2,600 ft) contour and includes twelve summits, four of which reach Munro status. Stob Choire Claurigh is the highest of the Grey Corries reaching a height of 1,177 metres (3,862 ft). The upper part of the mountain and the main section of the ridge is composed of pale grey quartzite rocks and scree making an eye-catching sight which is well seen from the villages of Spean Bridge and Roybridge and the A86 road which runs between them. 

The mountain's name has been translated from Gaelic as "peak of the brawling corrie", taken from the verb clamhras which means clamoring or brawling. The name may refer to the roaring of the many stags in the corries of the mountain during the breeding season.

Geography
Stob Choire Claurigh is a substantial mountain which includes four subsidiary tops (three of which are listed in the 1997 edition of Munro's Tables), four high corries and long, forested, northern slopes which descend to the valley of the River Spean. Three main ridges radiate from the summit. The northern ridge descends for two km to the “Munro Top” of Stob Coire Gaibhre (958 metres) continuing for a further two km to the Forestry Commission owned Leanachan Forest where it broadens into the Spean valley. Four hundred metres from the summit on the northern ridge is the North Top (1121 metres), at this point a spur goes east to the subsidiary summit of Stob Coire na Ceannain (1123 metres), offering easy scrambling. This eastern spur can be used as a means of ascent up rough, stony slopes from the Lairig Leachach pass.

The two other ridges link to adjacent Munros, with the south ridge connecting to Stob Ban, 1.5 km distant, over a col with a height of 803 metres. The twisting, high level SW ridge continues for three km over the “Munro Top” of Stob a’ Choire Lèith (1105 metres) to link to the Munro of Stob Coire an Laoigh. The four principal corries on the mountain are steep walled, holding snow well into the spring with streams which rise at around the 1000 metre mark, they drain in various directions but all eventually feed the River Spean, reaching the west coast at Loch Linnhe.

Ascents and view
The most popular starting point for the direct ascent of Stob Choire Claurigh is Corriechoille farm (grid reference ) at the end of the minor road from Spean Bridge. The route follows the Lairig Leacach track through a short section of the Leanachan Forest, the track is left immediately after the forest and steep slopes are climbed on the right hand side to reach the north east ridge. The ridge is followed over Stob Coire Gaibhre and along the rim of Coire na Ceannain which gives airy views down to its circular lochan, to reach the summit which is marked by a pile of quartzite boulders. There is a fine view from the top, especially to the SW where there is a fine outlook of the switchbacks and tops of the Grey Corries ridge backed by Aonach Beag and Ben Nevis. Many walkers will continue SW along the Grey Corries ridge descending eventually by the north ridge of Stob Coire an Laoigh down to the forest and eventually Corriechoille.

See also 
 Ben Nevis
 List of Munro mountains
 Mountains and hills of Scotland

References
 The Munros, Scottish Mountaineering Trust, Donald Bennett (Editor) et al., 
 The High Mountains of Britain and Ireland, Irvine Butterfield, 
 100 Best Routes on Scottish Mountains, Ralph Storer, 
 Hamish’s Mountain Walk, Baton Wicks, 1996, Hamish Brown, 
 The Magic of the Munros, Irvine Butterfield, 
Footnotes

Munros
Marilyns of Scotland
Mountains and hills of the Central Highlands
Mountains and hills of Highland (council area)
One-thousanders of Scotland